Cone Athletic Park or Cone Park was a minor league baseball park in Greensboro, North Carolina. It was the home of the Greensboro Patriots of the Piedmont League, the North Carolina State League, and other leagues from about 1902 up to their move to World War Memorial Stadium in 1930.

The ballpark was located on the southeast side of Summit Avenue, a couple of miles northeast of the eventual site of World War Memorial Stadium. It was developed by and named for the nearby Cone Mills textile plant. It served as the home grounds for Cone company baseball leagues as well as professional minor league ball. Its address, per city directories, was 1100 Summit Avenue.

The wooden ballpark was demolished sometime in the 1930s, and the land was developed. The Oaks Motel property, on the south corner of Summit and 4th Street, approximates the ballpark location.

References

External links
Some history
Newspaper reference

Defunct baseball venues in the United States
Sports venues in Greensboro, North Carolina
Baseball venues in North Carolina
Defunct minor league baseball venues
Defunct sports venues in North Carolina
1930s disestablishments in North Carolina